Samuel A. Tamposi (August 31, 1924 – May 25, 1995) was a prominent real estate developer and Republican Party activist from New Hampshire. He is best known for his work in the Nashua, New Hampshire and Citrus Hills, Florida areas, and for his friendship with Ted Williams, and association with the Boston Red Sox.

Tamposi played an integral role in bringing many Fortune 500 companies to New Hampshire, such as Fidelity Investments, Anheuser Busch, Coca-Cola, Raytheon, Sylvania, Sun Chemical, Kollsman Instruments and Honeywell.

Biography 
Samuel Tamposi was born in Nashua, New Hampshire in 1924 to Romanian parents who came to the United States. Though Tamposi grew up on a farm, his interests soon shifted to sales. In the mid 1950s, when Nashua's Textron plant shut down, Tamposi moved his business to real estate, investing most of his money in an abandoned building. He later sold the building and used the capital to develop a building for McCallister Scientific.

Tamposi met Gerald Nash after this first development, and the two formed a fast partnership.

Development of Citrus Hills 
In 1977, Tamposi was invited to become a limited partner in ownership of the Boston Red Sox. Through this association, Tamposi became friends with Ted Williams. Williams soon became a spokesperson for Tamposi and Nash's new planned Floridian community, Citrus Hills.

References 

1924 births
1995 deaths
American real estate businesspeople
American people of Romanian descent
New Hampshire Republicans
People from Nashua, New Hampshire
20th-century American businesspeople
American humanitarians
Businesspeople from New Hampshire